Marla Beth Feller is the Paul Licht Distinguished Professor in Biological Sciences and Member of the Helen Wills Neuroscience Institute at the University of California, Berkeley. She studies the mechanisms that underpin the assembly of neural circuits during development. Feller is a Fellow of the American Association for the Advancement of Science.

Early life and education 
Feller was inspired to work in physics at high school, where she was taught by a graduate student. She studied physics at the University of California, Berkeley and graduated in 1985. She remained there for her graduate studies, working under the supervision of Yuen-Ron Shen on liquid crystals. During her doctorate she played Ultimate Frisbee, and may have been one of the founders of the University of California, Berkeley women's Ultimate team. She completed her doctoral research in 1991, and embarked on a course in neural systems and behaviour at the Woods Hole Research Center.

Research and career 
After her PhD, Feller was a postdoctoral researcher at Bell Labs from 1992 to 1994, where she worked in the biological computation department with David W. Tank. She returned to the University of California, Berkeley, where she worked alongside Carla J. Shatz as a Miller postdoctoral fellow. Here she started to apply novel imaging approaches to neuroscience.
Feller was appointed as a tenure-track investigator at the National Institutes of Health in 1998. She joined the University of California, San Diego in 2000, first as the Silvo Varon Assistant Professor of Neuroregeneration and eventually as an Associate Professor. Feller was recruited to the University of California, Berkeley in 2007 and made Head of the Division of Neurobiology in 2013.

Her research evaluates the mechanisms that underpin the developmental assembly of neural circuits. She primarily investigates the retina, combining two-photon excitation microscopy and electrophysiology to establish how young retinas generate retinal waves, and the role that these waves play in retinal development. She has monitored the intrinsically photosensitive retinal ganglion cell (ipRGC) in newborn mice, identifying that they communicate with one another as part of a network that serves to boost retinal eye sensitivity. She has studied the ipRGC in mice, showing that even before the retina is fully developed a mouse can detect light. Her research also considers the organisation of neural circuitry that dictates directional sensitivity in the retina.

Awards and honours 

 2001 Kavli Frontiers of Science Fellow
 2002 McKnight Foundation Scholar Award
 2010 University of Washington Roger Brown Loucks Lectureship
 2011 École des Neuroscience of Paris Sabbatical 
 2011 France-Berkeley Fund Award
 2014 Brian Boycott Prize
 2016 University at Buffalo Pioneers in Neuroscience Award 
 2017 Elected a Fellow of the American Association for the Advancement of Science
 2018 University of California, Berkeley Distinguished Faculty Mentor Award

Selected publications

References 

Living people
Year of birth missing (living people)
Fellows of the American Association for the Advancement of Science
American women neuroscientists
American neuroscientists
University of California, Berkeley faculty
University of California, Berkeley alumni
21st-century American women